Vikranth is an Indian actor who has appeared in Tamil language films. He was first introduced in the film Karka Kasadara (2005) directed by R. V. Udayakumar and later appeared in other romantic drama films. Following his participation in the Celebrity Cricket League, Vikranth has moved on to work in bigger film projects.

Career
After pursuing Visual Communication in Loyola College, Vikranth made his lead acting debut with R. V. Udayakumar's Karka Kasadara (2005), before appearing as the lead actor in other small budget films such as Ninaithu Ninaithu Parthen (2007), Mudhal Kanave (2007) and Agathiyan's Nenjathai Killathe (2008). Vikranth then appeared alongside Vijayakanth in Engal Aasan (2009) and collaborated with Rasu Madhuravan twice in quick succession, with Goripalayam (2010) and Muthukku Muthaaga (2011), portraying a negative character in the former. His contributions as a cricketer in the Celebrity Cricket League  Vikranth's profile in the early 2010s and he began to work on more prominent films. He acted with Sathyaraj in Sattapadi Kutram (2011) directed by his uncle S. A. Chandrasekhar.

He had a cameo in Suseenthiran's Pandianadu, where he portrayed Vishal's friend who gets slain. Vikranth's following film Thakka Thakka (2015), directed by his brother Sanjeev, became the actor's widest solo release, with actors Vishal, Arya and Vishnu appearing in a promotional song for the film. Vikranth then signed on to portray the main antagonist in Udhayanidhi Stalin's Gethu (2016), appearing as a sniper with only one line of dialogue throughout the film.

In 2017, he appeared in Kavan directed by K. V. Anand. He portrayed a supporting role where Vijay Sethupathi acted in the lead role. Filmtimes describes it; Vikranth is engaging and memorable. The movie was a commercial success. The next movie was 
Samuthirakani's Thondan (2017) where Vikranth gets to play a pivotal role which he has performed with ease and élan. In the Suseenthiran's bilingual film, Nenjil Thunivirundhal (C/o Surya in Telugu) (2017), starring Sundeep Kishan and Vikranth, has not been receiving great reviews by critics. In 2019, his films were Suttu Pidikka Utharavu, Vennila Kabaddi Kuzhu 2 and Bakrid.

Personal life
His mom Sheela acted in Pandian Stores. His brother Sanjeev directed him in Thakka Thakka (2015). Earlier, Sanjeev had also worked as an actor, working on an incomplete film titled Beauty opposite Abhinayashree. He is the cousin of popular Tamil actor Vijay and nephew of Shoba and S. A. Chandrasekhar. He married actress Manasa Hemachandran, who is the daughter of late cinematographer Hemachandran and actress Kanakadurga, on 21 October 2009 in Chennai. His son was born on 23 July 2010. His second son was born in March 2016.

Filmography

All films are in Tamil, unless otherwise noted.

Television

References

Living people
Tamil male actors
Indian male film actors
Male actors in Tamil cinema
1984 births